Nadezhda Orlova (born 25 September 1979) is a Russian bobsledder. She competed in the two woman event at the 2006 Winter Olympics.

References

1979 births
Living people
Russian female bobsledders
Olympic bobsledders of Russia
Bobsledders at the 2006 Winter Olympics
Sportspeople from Saint Petersburg